Sevenoaks is a town in Kent with a population of 29,506 situated south-east of London, England. Also classified as a civil parish, Sevenoaks is served by a commuter main line railway into London. It is the principal town of the Sevenoaks district, followed by Swanley and Edenbridge.

A settlement was recorded in the 13th century, when a market was established. Construction of Knole House in the 15th century helped develop the village. Sevenoaks became part of the modern communications network when one of the early turnpikes was opened in the 18th century; the railway was relatively late in reaching it. In the 21st century, it has a large commuting population. The nearby Fort Halstead defence installation was formerly a major local employer. Located to the south-east of the town is Knole Park, within which lies Knole House.

Educational establishments in the town include the independent Sevenoaks School and Knole Academy.

Etymology
The town's name is derived from the Old English word "Seouenaca", the name given to a small chapel near seven oak trees in what is now Knole Park around AD 800.

In a book by K. Baedeker entitled, Great Britain: England, Wales, and Scotland as Far as Loch Maree and the Cromarty Firth (published in 1887) it is stated that Sevenoaks "is said to be a corruption of Chevenix".

History

There are few records earlier than the 13th century for the town, when it was given market status.  The weekly cattle market was held in Hitchen Hatch Lane until 1999. It was closed to make way for the "160 BT building" in London Road. A food market is held in the centre of town every Saturday. In the Middle Ages two hospitals were provided by religious orders for the care of old or sick people, especially those going on pilgrimage.

Sevenoaks School, at the south end of High Street, is one of the oldest lay foundations in England. It was founded by William Sevenoke in 1432. Sevenoke, a foundling, had been brought up in the town. In later life he became a merchant and served as alderman, sheriff and Mayor of London. Founding the school and adjacent almshouses was his thanks to the town. In 1560 the school was granted letters patent by Queen Elizabeth I and became known as 'Queen Elizabeth's Grammar School'. It was "for the education of boys and youths in grammar and learning".

In 1456 Thomas Bourchier, Archbishop of Canterbury, purchased the Knole estate and built Knole House. The mansion dominates the town.

The eponymous oak trees in Knole Park have been replaced several times over the centuries. In 1902 seven oaks were planted on the north side of The Vine cricket ground to commemorate the coronation of King Edward VII. During the Great Storm of 1987, six of those trees were blown down. Their replacements, planted in a ceremony involving well-known people from television shows such as Blue Peter and locals such as Gloria Hunniford and Caron Keating, were vandalised, leaving the one mature tree standing. The trees have been replaced and eight Oak trees of varying ages line The Vine.

A serious railway accident occurred nearby on 24 August 1927. Southern Railway K class passenger tank engine No. A800 River Cray was derailed hauling a Cannon Street to Deal express, knocking a road bridge and killing 13 passengers. The locomotive crew survived. The entire K class was subsequently rebuilt to prevent such an event from occurring again. The accident called into question the quality of track laying in the area.

Governance
Sevenoaks is governed by a town council with sixteen members. The town is divided into six wards: Kippington, Northern, St John's, Town, Wildernesse and Eastern. The offices of Sevenoaks District Council  are located in the town.

Geography
The town is situated at the junction of two main routes from the north before traffic climbs over the Greensand Ridge which crosses Kent from west to east; that situation is similar to Maidstone and Ashford. That road was one of the earliest in the county to be turnpiked in 1709, because of the clay soils.

The valley to the north is that of the River Darent; that river turns to the north to cut through the North Downs. Several lakes are located along the course of the river here, the result of the extraction of sand and gravel in the past.

The built-up area of the town has developed primarily along the main roads. The settlement of Riverhead to the north-west is the largest; other parts of the town (in clockwise order from the north) include Greatness; Wildernesse; St John's; Hollybush; Sevenoaks Common; and Kippington.

Demography
The 2001 census counts approximately 18,588 residents within the Sevenoaks civil parish authority, compared to its population in 1801 of 2,600. The built-up area of the town had a population of 24,987 at the 2011 census.

Economy
Sevenoaks, like much of West Kent, is characterised by high levels of economic activity and a skilled resident workforce. A large proportion of that workforce commutes elsewhere to their places of employment, mostly to central London. Those factors have led to high house prices and pressure on the local area to build more houses. Many of those houses attract high prices, making it difficult for people to buy property. A wide range of middle-class occupations are in short supply locally. Industries such as finance and business services tend to predominate. Transport links are generally very busy and town centre congestion is common at peak times.

The main industrial area is located north of the town, alongside the A225. Sevenoaks Quarry is on Bat and Ball Road, also to the north.

The shopping area in High Street includes the new Bligh's development. It is a typical small town centre, with one M&S department store having opened in 2014.

Bligh's shopping development opened in phases in 2002. The site was originally a meadow, before becoming a bus station and car park. Access can be gained from several directions including the High Street and London Road. In 2008, a new third side of the development opened, housing a Costa Coffee, a Robert Dyas and Tommelise and Zapata: A Mexican restaurant (now closed).  Much of the architecture is based on slightly earlier periods but with a contemporary edge.

Music string manufacturer RotoSound is based in Sevenoaks. The company's strings have been used by Jimi Hendrix, Brian May, and Pete Townshend. In the US, the company is associated with the 'British Invasion' sound of the 1960s and 70s.

Landmarks

Knole Park is a 1,000-acre (4 km²) SSSI and medieval deer park containing several thousand trees, a cricket pitch and a golf course running across. In its centre is Knole, the home of the Sackville family (the Earls of Dorset) since it was given to them by Queen Elizabeth I in 1577. The estate is owned and maintained by the National Trust, although the Sackvilles still live there.

Riverhill House and gardens are located directly to the south of Knole Park, on the southern edge of Sevenoaks. The house and gardens, which were first built in the 16th century, are privately owned by Jane Margaret Rogers but are periodically open to the public.

Religious sites

There are four churches belonging to the Church of England in Sevenoaks, dedicated to St Nicholas, St Luke, St Mary and St John the Baptist; and also St Mary's at Riverhead. The Roman Catholic church is dedicated to St Thomas of Canterbury; and there are some eight other denominations represented in the town. These include Hope Church (Charismatic), the United Reformed Church and also Baptist and Evangelical churches across the town and its villages.

Education

There is one mixed state secondary school, the Knole Academy, which was created in 2009 from an amalgamation of Wildernesse School (for boys) and Bradbourne School (for girls), and four state primary schools, one of which is Church of England and another of which is Catholic. 

Lady Boswell's C of E Primary School on Plymouth Drive dates back to 1675 and is one of the oldest state primary schools in England. Lady Margaret Boswell left a bequest to educate 12 poor scholars of the town. The first school building was erected on London Road in 1818: it is a Grade II Listed building with a neo-Classical frontage, now called Lady Boswell House.  The school moved to its current site in 1972. 

A Christian 'Free School' called Trinity School, opened in the 2010s on the Seal Hollow Road in the North-Eastern edge of town, and Seal Hollow Road is also the site of the controversial first new UK Grammar school, an annex of Weald of Kent Grammar School for girls in Tonbridge, in over 50 years. A further annex grammar school, of Tunbridge Grammar School for Boys, is due to open on the same site in September 2021.

Among the high number of independent schools is Sevenoaks School, a co-educational boarding and day school, The Granville School, a girls’ prep school 3-11 (with boys in pre-school) and Walthamstow Hall, an all-girls day school; and several preparatory schools, including Solefield School (an all-boys day school), New Beacon Preparatory School and Sevenoaks Preparatory School.

Transport
Sevenoaks is located at the junction of two ancient roads heading south from London and Dartford to the Weald. In 1710 part of one of the roads – from Sevenoaks through Tonbridge and Pembury to Tunbridge Wells – was the first in Kent to be turnpiked, and others followed within the century. It became the A21 road in the 1920s; the road now bypasses the town, and also takes traffic to the M25 London Orbital motorway at Junction 5. The Dartford road is now the A225.  The cross-country A25 road passes through the north of the town along the Vale of Holmesdale.

There are two railway stations in Sevenoaks, and two on the outskirts. The principal station is located on the South Eastern Main Line and also acts as the terminus for the suburban stopping services to both London Charing Cross and Blackfriars. The latter services follow the branch line via Swanley, calling at the second of the stations, named Bat & Ball.

The outlying stations are Dunton Green (served at off peak times by two trains per hour to London Charing Cross, and three trains per hour to London Cannon Street at peak times) and Otford (two trains per hour to London Victoria).

There are also bus routes in and around Sevenoaks provided by Go-Coach and Arriva Southern Counties.

Leisure
Sevenoaks Wildlife Reserve is to the north of the town centre, around one of the former gravel pits. It is a Site of Special Scientific Interest, covering some 175 acres (71 ha).

Sevenoaks Scouts is the active Scouting organisation in the town.

Sevenoaks Information provides a comprehensive What's On events diary for the town and surrounding area.

Sevenoaks Community Forum is a growing, active discussion forum for News and Events within Sevenoaks and surrounding areas.

Sevenoaks District Community Directory provides information on local leisure facilities, plus details of Clubs, Societies and Organisations covering all activities, including Sport across Sevenoaks and surrounding Towns / Villages.

Sports

Sevenoaks has three Non-League football clubs: Corinthian Football Club who play at Gay Dawn Farm, Sevenoaks Town F.C. who play at Greatness Park and Ide Hill F.C. who currently play in Borough Green due to construction of a new club house in Ide Hill village.

The Vine Cricket Ground is one of the oldest cricket venues in England. It was given to the town of Sevenoaks in 1773 by John Frederick Sackville, 3rd Duke of Dorset (1745–1799) and owner of Knole House.  The land was thought previously to have been used as a vineyard for the Archbishops of Canterbury.

Sevenoaks Suns is a women's basketball team that plays in the top flight of UK women's basketball, the WBBL. In 2017, the team won the WBBL Trophy, defeating the Leicester Riders 82-67 in the final in Glasgow.

Sevenoaks Hockey Club is a large club with a clubhouse at The Vine Pavilion.

Sevenoaks has two leisure centres and many sports and other activities are available.

Culture

Television viewers can receive either London (north/west via Crystal Palace) or Kent and Sussex (aerial pointing eastwards via Blue Bell Hill) transmissions. Programmes including London Tonight and BBC London, or Meridian Tonight and BBC South East Today.

The Stag Theatre, cinema and the Plaza music and conference complex is located at the top of London Road (TN13 1ZZ). It was re-opened as a community arts centre by Sevenoaks Town Council on 2 January 2009 and is supported by a strong network of volunteers. It became a not for profit charity in 2010. The multiplex cinema is open daily showing films. Around £550,000 has invested in equipment, infrastructure and the building since it re-opened.

The demonym for a person from Sevenoaks is Sennockian. The demonym Old Sennockian is used by alumni of Sevenoaks School.

Local media
The local radio station for Sevenoaks is KMFM West Kent, although no local programmes are broadcast on the station due to it being part of the KMFM network across Kent that broadcasts from Medway. The station still receives local adverts, what-on local events and sponsors.

Sevenoaks is served by county wide stations BBC Radio Kent, Heart South, Smooth Radio and many London stations. Because of its proximity to London, television signals are in the main received from the Crystal Palace transmitter, placing Sevenoaks in the BBC London and ITV London areas, rather than BBC South East or ITV Meridian which serve most of Kent from the Bluebell Hill and Dover transmitters.

The local paper is the Sevenoaks Chronicle, which is published every Thursday by the Courier Media Group.

Notable people

John Donne (1572–1631), poet
Jeffery Amherst (1717–1791), British Army Officer
George Kelson (1835–1920), amateur cricketer, fisherman and author
H. G. Wells (1866–1946), writer
W. H. Davies (1871–1940), Welsh tramp-poet, lived in Sevenoaks 1907–1914
Edward Thomas (1878–1917), poet
Netta Muskett (1887–1963), novelist
Basil Copper (1924–2013), writer
Bill Bruford (1949–), jazz and rock drummer
Timothy Laurence (1955–) (husband of Anne, Princess Royal) attended the Sevenoaks School
Tony Hayward (1957–), former CEO of BP
Diana, Princess of Wales (1961–1997), went to West Heath School in Sevenoaks
James Whitbourn (1963–), composer
Phil Hartnoll (1964–), musician with Orbital
Paul Hartnoll (1968–), musician with Orbital
Matthew Branton (1968–), novelist
Murray Lachlan Young (1969–), performance poet
Lizzy Yarnold (1988–), skeleton two time winter Olympic gold medalist.
Anton du Beke (1966–), ballroom dancer
Peter Sissons (1942–2019), newsreader
Robert Charles Zaehner (1913–1974), British academic whose field of study was Eastern religions
Charlie Whiting (1952–2019), FIA Formula One Race Director
Mike Conway (born 1983)  2006 British Formula Three champion and 2019–20 FIA World Endurance Championship winner

Twinnings
  Pontoise, France
  Rheinbach, Germany

References

Notes
 Kent History Illustrated Frank W. Jessup (Kent County Council, 1966)
 Railways of the Southern Region Geoffrey Body (PSL Field Guide 1989)

External links 

 
Towns in Kent
Market towns in Kent